Nachaba is a genus of snout moths. It was described by Francis Walker in 1859.

Species
 Nachaba auritalis Walker, 1859
 Nachaba congrualis Walker, 1859
 Nachaba diplagialis
 Nachaba flavisparsalis Warren, 1891
 Nachaba fluella
 Nachaba funerea (C. Felder, R. Felder & Rogenhofer, 1875)
 Nachaba nyctalis
 Nachaba oppositalis Walker, 1859
 Nachaba reconditana (Walker, 1864)
 Nachaba tryphaenalis C. Felder, R. Felder & Rogenhofer, 1875)

References

Chrysauginae
Pyralidae genera